Syed Jalaluddin Rizvi is a former field hockey player who represented India in the 1984 Summer Olympics, Los Angeles USA. He is from Bhopal in the state of Madhya Pradesh. He played at the right wing position. He was awarded the Arjuna Award in 2000 for his achievements.

Other awards:
Champions Trophy Silver medalist
Azalan shah Gold medalist
Vikram Award by Govt. of Madhya Pradesh
Zainabia Award by Zainabia Trust India

References 

Living people
Field hockey players from Bhopal
Recipients of the Arjuna Award
Indian male field hockey players
Year of birth missing (living people)